Clemens Fuest (born 23 August 1968) is a German economist who has been President of the Ifo Institute for Economic Research and director of the Center for Economic Studies at the University of Munich (LMU) since 2016.

Career
Between 2008 and 2013, Fuest was a professor of business taxation at the University of Oxford and Research Director of the Oxford University Centre for Business Taxation, which is part of the Saïd Business School. In 2008, he served as a member of the Independent Expert Group to the Commission on Scottish Devolution. He was member and chairman of the Council of Economic Advisors at the German Federal Ministry of Finance. 

From March 2013 Fuest served as President of the Centre for European Economic Research (ZEW) in Mannheim and professor at the University of Mannheim. Since 2013, he has also been serving on the advisory board of the Stability Council, a body devised as part of Germany’s national implementation of the European Fiscal Compact. That same year, he joined Henrik Enderlein, Marcel Fratzscher, Jakob von Weizsäcker and others in founding the Glienicker Gruppe, a group of pro-European lawyers, economists, and political scientists.

In 2014, Fuest was appointed by the Council of the European Union to be part of the High Level Group on Own Resources, led by Mario Monti. Since 2015, he has been serving as one of two scientific advisers to the Commission on the Minimum Wage at the Federal Ministry of Labour and Social Affairs.

Other activities

Corporate boards
 HSBC Trinkaus & Burkhardt, Member of the Advisory Board
 Landesbank Baden-Württemberg (LBBW), Member of the Advisory Board (since 2014)
 Ernst & Young Germany, Member of the Scientific Advisory Board (since 2008)

Non-profit organizations
 Foundation for Family Businesses, Member of the Board of Trustees
 Hochschule für Bildende Künste Braunschweig, Member of the University Council (since 2011)
 European Academy of Sciences and Arts, Member (since 2010)
 International Institute of Public Finance (IIFP), Vice President of the Board (2009–2018), President of the Board (since 2018)
 Hanns Martin Schleyer Foundation, Friedwart Bruckhaus Prize, Member of the Jury
 Wirtschaftsrat der CDU, Member of the Scientific Advisory Board
 Institute for the Study of Labor (IZA), Fellow (since 2007)
 Hanns Martin Schleyer Foundation, Friedwart Bruckhaus Prize, Member of the Jury
 German Academy of Science and Engineering, Member 
 American Economic Association, Member

Editorial boards
 Canadian Journal of Economics, Advisory Editor
 Fiscal Studies, Member of the Editorial Board
 Wirtschaftsdienst, Member of the Scientific Advisory Board
 ORDO, Member of the Editorial Board

Recognition
 2013 – Gustav Stolper Award

References

External links
Homepage at Ifo Institute

1968 births
Living people
German economists
Economics educators
Academics of the University of Oxford